Umaraha is a census town in Varanasi tehsil  of Varanasi district in the Indian state of Uttar Pradesh. The census town &  village falls under the Umaraha gram panchayat. Umarha Census town & village is  about 12 kilometers North-East of Varanasi railway station, 317 kilometers South-East of Lucknow  and 17 kilometers North-East of Banaras Hindu University main  gate.

Demography 
Umaraha  has 961 families with a total population of 6,429. Sex ratio of the census town is 921 and child sex ratio is  1,000. Uttar Pradesh state average for both ratios is 912 and 902  respectively .

Transportation 
Umaraha is connected by air (Lal Bahadur Shastri Airport), by train (Varanasi railway station) and also connected by Highway Number 29. Nearest operational airports are Lal Bahadur Shastri Airport.The nearest operational railway station is  Sarnath Station  and Varanasi railway station (6 and 36 kilometres respectively from Umaraha).

See also 
 Varanasi (Lok Sabha constituency)

Notes
  All  demographic data is based on 2011 Census of India.

References 

Census towns in Varanasi district
Cities and towns in Varanasi district